Peekskill Seaplane Base  was a public use seaplane base located three nautical miles (5.5 km) southwest of the central business district of Peekskill, a city in Westchester County, New York, United States. It was privately owned by James M. W. Martin.
The seaplane base was situated on the Hudson River in Verplanck, a hamlet in the Town of Cortlandt.

Also located at this site is the Riveredge Trailer Park, founded and operated by James Martin since 1950. In 1991 he donated the seaplane base, trailer park and waterfront area to the Town of Cortlandt. The  of land was given with an agreement that the trailer park would remain open until 10 years after his death, at which time the town will turn it into a park. Martin had been offered $5.5 million by a developer looking to build condominiums on the property.
Martin died on July 3, 2006 in his Greenwich, Connecticut home at the age of 87.
The seaplane base was removed from FAA records in 2007.

Facilities and Aircraft 
For the 12-month period ending April 29, 2005, it had 1,020 aircraft operations, an average of 85 per month, of which 98% was general aviation and 2% was military. At that time 9 aircraft were based there, including 89% single-engine and 11% multi-engine.

References

External links 

Defunct airports in New York (state)
Transportation buildings and structures in Westchester County, New York